Steve Sandler (1940 – July 8, 2014) was an American handball player.

Biography
Sandler was born in 1940.

Between 1966 and 1971, Sandler won the U.S. Handball Association Singles Championship six consecutive times.

In 1985, he was elected to the Handball Hall of Fame.

He died July 8, 2014.

References

1940 births
2014 deaths
American handball players
American people of Jewish descent
International Jewish Sports Hall of Fame inductees